David Williams (15 October 1786, in Lasham, Hampshire – 22 March 1860, in New College, Oxford) was Master of Winchester College, Warden of New College, Oxford (1840–60), and Vice-Chancellor of Oxford University (1856–58).

Williams is buried in the antechapel of New College chapel.

References

1786 births
1860 deaths
People from East Hampshire District
Headmasters of Winchester College
Wardens of New College, Oxford
Vice-Chancellors of the University of Oxford